"Say" is a song recorded by Australian singer-songwriter Ruel. The song was released in March 2019 as the fifth and final single from Ruel's debut extended play, Ready. An acoustic version, featuring Jake Meadows was released on 15 March 2019.

In an interview about the EP, Ruel said "The one that I always get really emotional to, is probably 'Say'. Every time I do that live people get their phone-lights out, and I see the crowd reacting and then I start reacting, and it just makes a special moment. That song is very fun to sing and to emote to."

The song was certified gold in Australia in November 2021.

Reception
In a review of the EP, Broadway World called the song "a nostalgic, heartfelt power-ballad that exquisitely showcases the young artist's impressive vocal range and control."

Track listing
Radio
"Say" – 3:47

Digital download – Acoustic version
 "Say" (featuring Jake Meadows) - Acoustic Version  – 3:58

Certifications

References
 

2019 singles
2018 songs
Ruel (singer) songs
RCA Records singles
Songs written by M-Phazes
Songs written by Ruel (singer)
Songs written by Alex Hope (songwriter)